Andrew Westmoreland is a retired American academic administrator. He was the 18th President of Samford University in Birmingham, Alabama since 2006 to 2021. From 1998 to 2006, he was the president of Ouachita Baptist University in Arkadelphia, Arkansas.

Early life
Andrew Westmoreland was born in Batesville, Arkansas. He received a B.A. in political science from Ouachita Baptist University in 1979, an M.A. in the same field from the University of Arkansas at Fayetteville, and an Ed.D. in Higher Education Administration from the University of Arkansas at Little Rock.

Career
Westmoreland served as the president of Ouachita Baptist University in Arkadelphia, Arkansas from 1998 to 2006. From July 2006 to June 2021 he served as the president of Samford University. In addition to serving as president, he has also taught political science at Samford University and served as the director of the Frances Marlin Mann Center for Leadership and Ethics  Westmoreland was also initiated into Omicron Delta Kappa at Samford in 2007. On August 26, 2020, Westmoreland announced that he would retire effective June 30, 2021. He was succeeded on July 1, 2021, by Beck A. Taylor, formerly a dean at Samford.

Westmoreland currently serves as executive director of the Frances Marlin Mann Center for Ethics and Leadership at Samford as well as president emeritus.

Personal life
With his wife Jeanna, Westmoreland has a daughter.

Works

References

Living people
People from Batesville, Arkansas
Baptists from Arkansas
Ouachita Baptist University alumni
University of Arkansas alumni
University of Arkansas at Little Rock alumni
Political science educators
Samford University people
Samford University faculty
Heads of universities and colleges in the United States
Year of birth missing (living people)